The Division of Isaacs was an Australian Electoral Division in the state of Victoria. It was located in the inner southern suburbs of Melbourne. It included the suburbs of St Kilda, Ripponlea and part of Caulfield.

The Division was named after Sir Isaac Isaacs, former Chief Justice of Australia and the first Australian-born Governor-General of Australia. It was proclaimed at the redistribution of 11 May 1949, and was first contested at the 1949 Federal election. It was abolished at the redistribution of 21 November 1968 when a separate Division of Isaacs was created in outer Melbourne.

Members

Election results

1949 establishments in Australia
Constituencies established in 1949
1969 disestablishments in Australia
Constituencies disestablished in 1969
Isaacs (1949-69)